Edgar Henri Cuepper (born 16 May 1949) is a Belgian equestrian and Olympic medalist. He was born in Eupen. He competed in show jumping at the 1976 Summer Olympics in Montreal, and won a bronze medal with the Belgian team.

References

1949 births
Living people
Belgian male equestrians
Olympic equestrians of Belgium
Olympic bronze medalists for Belgium
Equestrians at the 1976 Summer Olympics
Olympic medalists in equestrian
Medalists at the 1976 Summer Olympics
People from Eupen
Sportspeople from Liège Province